Don Gregorio is an 1826 opera by Gaetano Donizetti from a libretto by Jacopo Ferretti and adapted from his popular 1824 opera buffa L'ajo nell'imbarazzo (The Tutor Embarrassed), which had enjoyed considerable success when presented at the Teatro Valle in Rome on 4 February 1824.

When Francesco Tortoli was interested in producing it in Naples, it was determined that L'ajo nell'imbarazzo was unsuitable as it stood. Donizetti then signed a contract with Tortoli for 300 ducats to adapt it into a new opera, Don Gregorio, and to compose one further opera. For the adaptation, Donizetti composed some additional music, revised the recitatives into spoken dialogue, and translated the role of Don Gregorio into the Neapolitan dialect. The opera premiered at the Teatro Nuovo on 11 June 1826.

Performance history
19th century

Having been given under its original title, Donizetti revisions became Don Gregorio, and with that name, it premiered at the Teatro Nuovo. That same year, it also was given at La Scala and many Italian  theatres.  On 28 July 1846 it was first given in London, but "seems to have disappeared from view until it turned up again in Italy in the twentieth century". However, under one or other of its names, the opera was presented as late as 1866 in Milan and 1879 in Venice.

20th century and beyond

Don Gregorio was presented at the Teatro Donizetti in the composer's home town of Bergamo in 1959 and an Italian TV production was broadcast in 1964. It was not until 1980 that it appeared in New York.

A successful staging of L'ajo nell'imbarazzo by the Wexford Festival in 1973 led to that opera appearing in four additional European cities between 1975 and 1990, and in 2006, Wexford staged Don Gregorio, based on the new critical edition
 by Maria Chiara Bertieri.

Don Gregorio was then revived in Bergamo, Fano and Catania, with Paolo Bordogna in the title role and directed for the stage by Roberto Recchia. A new video recording was made from live performances given by the Teatro Donizetti in November 2007.

Roles

Synopsis
See

Recordings

See also
List of operas performed at the Wexford Festival

References
Notes

Cited sources
Ashbrook, William and Sarah Hibberd (2001), "L'ajo nell'imbarazzio, o Don Gregorio"  in  Holden, Amanda (Ed.), The New Penguin Opera Guide, New York: Penguin Putnam. 
Osborne, Charles, (1994),  The Bel Canto Operas of Rossini, Donizetti, and Bellini,  Portland, Oregon: Amadeus Press. 
 Weinstock, Herbert (1963), Donizetti and the World of Opera in Italy, Paris, and Vienna in the First Half of the Nineteenth Century, New York: Pantheon Books. 

Other sources
Allitt, John Stewart (1991), Donizetti: in the light of Romanticism and the teaching of Johann Simon Mayr, Shaftesbury: Element Books, Ltd (UK); Rockport, MA: Element, Inc.(USA)
Ashbrook, William (1982), Donizetti and His Operas, Cambridge University Press.  
Ashbrook, William (1998), "L'ajo nell'imbarazzio, o Don Gregorio" in Stanley Sadie  (Ed.), The New Grove Dictionary of Opera, Vol. Two.  London: Macmillan Publishers, Inc.   
Ashbrook, William (1998), "Donizetti, Gaetano" in Stanley Sadie  (Ed.),  The New Grove Dictionary of Opera, Vol. One. London: Macmillan Publishers, Inc.   
Black, John (1982), Donizetti’s Operas in Naples, 1822—1848. London: The Donizetti Society.
Loewenberg, Alfred (1970). Annals of Opera, 1597-1940, 2nd edition.  Rowman and Littlefield
Sadie, Stanley, (Ed.); John Tyrell (Exec. Ed.) (2004), The New Grove Dictionary of Music and Musicians.  2nd edition. London: Macmillan.    (hardcover).   (eBook).

External links
  Donizetti Society (London) website

Italian-language operas
Operas by Gaetano Donizetti
1826 operas
Operas based on plays
Operas
Operas set in Italy